Dolichodes geniculatus is a species of beetle in the family Carabidae, the only species in the genus Dolichodes.

References

Platyninae